Olisa Harold Ndah (born 21 January 1998) is a Nigerian professional footballer who plays as a centre-back for South African Premier Division side Orlando Pirates and the Nigeria national team.

Club career 
Ndah joined Nigeria Premier League side Remo Stars during the 2018–19 season on a two-year contract. On 25 January 2020, Akwa United officially announced the acquisition of Ndah on a two-year deal.

Ndah won the Nigerian Professional Football league title with Akwa United, his first silverware with the club. 

On the 26th of August 2021 he was announced as a new Orlando Pirates player.

International
Ndah has represented Nigeria U23 at the 2019 Africa U-23 Cup of Nations in Egypt.

References

External links
 
 

1998 births
Living people
Sportspeople from Delta State
Nigerian footballers
Association football central defenders
Nigeria international footballers
Nigeria youth international footballers
2021 Africa Cup of Nations players
Nigeria Professional Football League players
Sharks F.C. players
Sliema Wanderers F.C. players
Ħamrun Spartans F.C. players
Sirens F.C. players
Remo Stars F.C. players
Akwa United F.C. players
Nigerian expatriate footballers
Nigerian expatriate sportspeople in Malta
Expatriate footballers in Malta